A sich,  was an administrative and military centre of the Zaporozhian Cossacks. The word sich derives from the Ukrainian verb сікти siktý, "to chop" – with the implication of clearing a forest for an encampment or of building a fortification with the trees that have been chopped down.

The Zaporizhian Sich was the fortified capital of the Zaporozhian Cossacks, located on the Dnieper River, in the 16th–18th centuries in the area of what is today Ukraine. The Sich Rada was the highest organ of government in the Zaporozhian Host, or army of the Zaporozhian Cossacks. The Danubian Sich was the fortified settlement of those Zaporozhian Cossacks who later settled in the Danube Delta.

Other transcriptions 

 Sietch
 Jeremiah Curtin (1898) — Saitch
Samuel Binion (1898) - Sich
Beatrice Baskerville (1907) - Setch
Isabel Hepgood (1915) - Syech
Harold Lamb (1917) - Siech
William Cresson (1919) - Sitch

References

Kiev Voivodeship
Zaporizhian Sich